The Day After is the fifth studio album by American rapper Twista, released on October 4, 2005 via Atlantic Records. There is a version chopped and screwed by Paul Wall. The album was certified Gold by the RIAA and received to generally positive reviews. This album is also the first album by Twista where there is no production by longtime collaborator, The Legendary Traxster.

Track listing

Charts

Weekly charts

Certifications

Year-end charts

References

External links
 
 https://www.amazon.com/Day-After-Twista/dp/B000ASTEE0

Twista albums
2005 albums
Atlantic Records albums
Albums produced by the Neptunes
Albums produced by Rodney Jerkins
Albums produced by Mr. Collipark
Albums produced by Scott Storch